A Clockwork Orange may refer to:
 A Clockwork Orange (novel), a 1962 novel by Anthony Burgess
 A Clockwork Orange (film), a 1971 film directed by Stanley Kubrick based on the novel
 A Clockwork Orange (soundtrack), the film's official soundtrack
 A Clockwork Orange: Wendy Carlos's Complete Original Score, a 1972 album by Wendy Carlos featuring music composed for the film
 A Clockwork Orange: A Play with Music, a 1987 theatrical adaptation by Anthony Burgess
 Clockwork Orange (plot), a supposed 1970s operation to discredit British politicians
 "Clockwork Orange", a nickname for the Glasgow Subway in Glasgow, Scotland
 "Clockwork Orange", a nickname in the early 1970s for the Netherlands national football team

See also
 "A Clockwork Origin", an episode of the US TV series Futurama